The 2016 Aragon Superbike World Championship round was the third round of the 2016 Superbike World Championship. It took place over the weekend of 1–3 April 2016 at the Motorland Aragón.

Championship standings after the round

Superbike Championship standings after Race 1

Superbike Championship standings after Race 2

Supersport Championship standings

External links
 Superbike Race 1 results
 Superbike Race 2 results
 Supersport Race results

2016 Superbike World Championship season
Aragon Superbike World Championship round
Aragon Superbike World Championship round